Thomas Jefferson "Tom" Barlow III (August 7, 1940 – January 31, 2017), was an American politician who served as a member of the United States House of Representatives from Kentucky's 1st congressional district for one term.

Early life and education 
Barlow was born in Washington, D.C., but grew up in Louisville, Kentucky. He graduated from Haverford College in Pennsylvania.

Career 
After graduating from college, Barlow worked as a banker and business executive, and later as a conservation consultant for the Natural Resources Defense Council from 1971 to 1982. In 1986 he sought election to Congress but was unsuccessful.

In 1992 Barlow ran in the primary against incumbent Democratic representative Carroll Hubbard to represent Kentucky's 1st district in the United States House of Representatives. Barlow upset Hubbard in the primary and won the seat. Barlow served in the 103rd Congress from January 3, 1993 to January 3, 1995.

In 1994 Barlow ran for re-election but was defeated by Ed Whitfield in an election year that saw many Republican victories nationwide as the Republican Party won the House of Representatives for the first time in forty years.

Barlow sought the 1st District House seat again in 1998 but lost. Barlow ran for the United States Senate in 2002 but narrowly lost the Democratic primary to Lois Combs Weinberg. Barlow won the Democratic nomination for his old seat yet again in 2006 but was defeated by Ed Whitfield in the general election.

Death 
He died on January 31, 2017.

References

External links

 
 

1940 births
2017 deaths
Haverford College alumni
Businesspeople from Louisville, Kentucky
Politicians from Louisville, Kentucky
Democratic Party members of the United States House of Representatives from Kentucky
Businesspeople from Washington, D.C.
Politicians from Washington, D.C.
20th-century American businesspeople